The 2008 Superleague Formula season was the inaugural Superleague Formula championship. The season started very late in 2008 with the first round being on August 31 at Donington Park. There were six rounds (twelve races) in total with the successful season finale at Circuito Permanente de Jerez on 23 November. In the 18 cars on the grid were established A1GP and GP2 drivers as well as two ex-Formula One race starters, Robert Doornbos and Antônio Pizzonia.

Beijing Guoan, run under former Formula One team Zakspeed with driver Davide Rigon, were eventually crowned the first ever champions at the last event of the season.

Teams and drivers
 All teams competed on Michelin tyres.

 No numbers 1 or 2 because it was the first season.
 Cars 16 and 17 were run by Team West-Tec during pre-season.
 Atlético Madrid did not enter until prior to round 2.
 FC Porto switched from Alan Docking Racing to Hitech Racing prior round 5.

Test/reserve drivers

2008 Schedule

Race calendar and results

 Race 2 starts with reverse grid from finishing order of Race 1.

Test calendar and results
 The first group test was at Vallelunga, Italy and ran from August 6–8. Scuderia Playteam were the fastest team on all three days with drivers Robert Doornbos and Alessandro Pier Guidi putting in the fast laps, for the clubs they would later go on to race for. Prior to the opening round, two test sessions at Donington Park, UK on August 21 and 28 further helped the cars and it was the combination of FMS International and Enrico Toccacelo for A.S. Roma who were fastest on both occasions.

Championship standings

References

External links
 Superleague Formula Official Website
 V12 Racing: Independent Superleague Formula Fansite Magazine

 
Superleague Formula
Superleague Formula season
Superleague Formula